The official results of the Women's pole vault at the 2002 European Championships in Munich, Germany. The final was held on 9 August 2002. The qualifying round was staged two days earlier, on August 7, with the mark set at 4.45 metres.

Medalists

Abbreviations
All results shown are in metres

Records

Qualification

Final

See also
 1998 Women's European Championships Pole Vault (Budapest)
 1999 Women's World Championships Pole Vault (Seville)
 2000 Women's Olympic Pole Vault (Sydney)
 2001 Women's World Championships Pole Vault (Edmonton)
 2003 Women's World Championships Pole Vault (Paris)
 2004 Women's Olympic Pole Vault (Athens)
 2006 Women's European Championships Pole Vault (Gothenburg)

Notes

References
 Results
 moniquedewilt

Pole vault
Pole vault at the European Athletics Championships
2002 in women's athletics